Aucó Airport ,  is an airport  northeast of Illapel, a city in the Coquimbo Region of Chile.

The runway is in a valley with low mountains in all quadrants, and nearby hills to the northwest.

See also

Transport in Chile
List of airports in Chile

References

External links
OpenStreetMap - Aucó
OurAirports - Aucó
FallingRain - Aucó Airport

Airports in Coquimbo Region